|}

The British Champions Long Distance Cup is a Group 2 flat horse race in Great Britain open to thoroughbreds aged three years or older. It is run at Ascot over a distance of 1 mile 7 furlongs and 209 yards (3,209 metres), and it is scheduled to take place as part of British Champions Day each year in October.

History
The event was originally held at Newmarket under the title Jockey Club Cup. It was established in 1873, and was initially contested over 2¼ miles.

The distance of the race was shortened to 1½ miles in 1959. It was extended to its current length in 1963. The event was given Group 3 status in 1971.

For a period the Jockey Club Cup was staged during Newmarket's Cambridgeshire Meeting. It was switched to the venue's Champions Day fixture in 2000. It had a prize fund of £65,000 in 2010.

The race was transferred to Ascot and given its present name in 2011. It became part of the newly created British Champions Day, and its purse was increased to £200,000. It now serves as the long-distance final of the British Champions Series and was upgraded from Group 3 to Group 2 from its 2014 running.

Records

Most successful horse (5 wins):
 Further Flight – 1991, 1992, 1993, 1994, 1995

Leading jockey (7 wins):
 Sir Gordon Richards – Brumeux (1930), Brulette (1932), Felicitation (1934), Foxglove II (1938), Shahpoor (1943), Vic Day (1948, 1949)

Leading trainer (7 wins):
 Barry Hills – Further Flight (1991, 1992, 1993, 1994, 1995), Rainbow High (1999), Tastahil (2010)

Winners since 1978

Earlier winners

 1873: Flageolet
 1874: Gang Forward
 1875: Carnelion
 1876: Braconnier
 1877: Verneuil
 1878: Silvio
 1879: Jannette
 1880: Chippendale
 1881: Corrie Roy
 1882: Chippendale
 1883: Ladislas
 1884: St Gatien
 1885: St Gatien
 1886: St Gatien
 1887: Carlton
 1888: Reve d'Or
 1889: Sheen
 1890: Wild Monk
 1891: Patrick Blue
 1892: Buccaneer
 1893: Lady Rosebery
 1894: Callistrate
 1895: Florizel II
 1896: Canterbury Pilgrim
 1897: Count Schomberg
 1898: Merman
 1899: Mazagan
 1900: Osbech
 1901: King's Courier
 1902: Black Sand
 1903: Mead
 1904: Zinfandel
 1905: Pretty Polly
 1906: Bachelor's Button
 1907: Radium
 1908: Radium
 1909: Amadis
 1910: Lagos
 1911: Willonyx
 1912: Aleppo
 1913: Aleppo
 1914: Son-in-Law
 1915: Son-in-Law
 1916: Hurry On
 1917: Brown Prince
 1918: Queen's Square
 1919: Gay Lord
 1920: no race
 1921: Nippon
 1922: Bucks Hussar
 1923: Tranquil
 1924: Plack
 1925: Bucellas
 1926: Bongrace
 1927: Mont Bernina
 1928: Invershin
 1929: Fairway
 1930: Brumeux
 1931: Noble Star
 1932: Brulette
 1933: Nitsichin
 1934: Felicitation
 1935: Quashed
 1936: Quashed
 1937: Buckleigh
 1938: Foxglove II
 1939: no race
 1940: Atout Maitre
 1941: no race
 1942: Afterthought
 1943: Shahpoor
 1944: Ocean Swell
 1945: Amber Flash
 1946: Felix
 1947: Laurentis
 1948: Vic Day
 1949: Vic Day
 1950: Colonist II
 1951: Eastern Emperor
 1952: Blarney Stone
 1953: Ambiguity
 1954: Yorick
 1955: Romany Air
 1956: Donald
 1957: Flying Flag
 1958: French Beige
 1959: Vacarme
 1960: Parthia
 1961: Apostle
 1962: Pardao
 1963: Gaul
 1964: Oncidium
 1965: Goupi
 1966: Hermes
 1967: Dancing Moss
 1968: Riboccare
 1969: High Line
 1970: High Line
 1971: High Line
 1972: Irvine
 1973: Parnell
 1974: Petty Officer
 1975: Blood Royal
 1976: Bright Finish
 1977: Grey Baron

See also
 Horse racing in Great Britain
 List of British flat horse races
 Recurring sporting events established in 1873 – this race is included under its original title, Jockey Club Cup.

References

 Paris-Turf: 

 Racing Post:

 galopp-sieger.de – Jockey Club Cup.
 horseracingintfed.com – International Federation of Horseracing Authorities – British Champions Long Distance Cup (2018).
 pedigreequery.com – Jockey Club Cup – Newmarket.
 tbheritage.com – Jockey Club Cup.
 

Flat races in Great Britain
Ascot Racecourse
Open long distance horse races
British Champions Series

1873 establishments in England